The Gospel of Eureka is a 2018 documentary directed by Michael Palmieri and Donal Mosher about the lives of LGBT individuals and evangelical Christians in Eureka Springs, Arkansas.

References

External links
 

American documentary films
Films set in Arkansas
American LGBT-related films
Eureka Springs, Arkansas
2018 films
Documentary films about LGBT and Christianity
2018 LGBT-related films
2010s English-language films
2010s American films